A list of horror films released in 1998.

References

Lists of horror films by year
1998-related lists